Mav Cacharel  (born January 14, 1957) began performing at age 13 in Brazzaville, Republic of Congo, with his first group Les Ombres. He won the Prix découvertes RFI prize in 1983.

He used the money to move to Paris, where he made a living as a session singer with band Loketo composed of Aurlus Mabélé, Diblo Dibala and Jean Baron.

After singing for various African and West Indian recordings, he recorded his first album Chanti die in 1987. In 1988, he left the group Loketo in order to create the group Kebo.

He made several hit albums in the late '80s with his backing band Kebo, which is a popular street music in Brazzaville and Kinshasa.

Discography

Studio albums

 1987 : Chanti Die !
 1988 : Trouble
 1989 : Pour toi
 1990 : Kebo
 1991 : Louzolo
 1992 : Triple force
 1997 : Mokokissa
 2004 : Kebo na Brazzaville
 2007 : Réconciliation
 2008 : Acte II : Confirmation
 2017 : Lumière

References 

1957 births
Living people
Republic of the Congo musicians
Soukous musicians